Viktoria Uladzimirauna Chaika (Вікторыя Уладзіміраўна Чайка, born 26 December 1980) is a Belarusian female sport shooter. At the 2012 Summer Olympics, she competed in the Women's 10 metre air pistol, finishing fifth, and the Women's 25 metre pistol, finishing 25th.  She also competed at the 2008,  2004 and 2000 Olympic games in the 10 metre air pistol (finishing in 4th, 16th and 11th respectively) and the 2008 and 2004 Games in the 25 metre pistol events (finishing in 13th and 32nd respectively).

References

Belarusian female sport shooters
Living people
Olympic shooters of Belarus
Shooters at the 2000 Summer Olympics
Shooters at the 2004 Summer Olympics
Shooters at the 2008 Summer Olympics
Shooters at the 2012 Summer Olympics
Shooters at the 2016 Summer Olympics
1980 births
Shooters at the 2015 European Games
European Games bronze medalists for Belarus
European Games medalists in shooting
Shooters at the 2019 European Games
Shooters at the 2020 Summer Olympics
21st-century Belarusian women